Highway 758, the Hendon Grid Road, is a highway in the Canadian province of Saskatchewan. It runs from Highway 640 near Quill Lake to Highway 35 near Hendon.

See also 
Roads in Saskatchewan
Transportation in Saskatchewan

References 

758